The Tinder Box is an East German fantasy film directed by Siegfried Hartmann. It was released in 1959.

It was later purchased by the BBC and shown as part of their "Tales From Europe" series of dubbed films on children's television, first shown in 1964 and repeated in 1970 and 1972.

Cast
 Rolf Ludwig as Der Soldat / The Soldier
 Heinz Schubert as  Der Geizige / The Miser
 Rolf Defrank as  Der Eitle / The Vain Man
 Hannes Fischer as  Der Dicke / The Fat Man
 Hans Fiebrandt as  Der König / The King
 Maria Besendahl as  The Queen
 Senta Bonacker as  Die Kammerfrau / The Lady-in-waiting
 Fritz Schlegel as  Der Wirt / The Innkeeper
 Barbara Mehlan as  Die Prinzessin / The Princess
 Maria Wendt as  Altes Mütterchen / The Old Woman

Reception
The picture sold 5,429,103 tickets.

References

External links
 

1959 films
East German films
Films based on works by Hans Christian Andersen
1950s German-language films
1950s fantasy films

Films_based_on_fairy_tales
German fantasy films
1950s German films